Marin Petrov (born 7 August 1977 in Varna) is a former Bulgarian football midfielder. He has won one A PFG title and one Bulgarian Cup at club level, playing for 11 different teams in Bulgaria and Greece throughout his career.

Petrov began his professional career for Spartak Varna in 1997. He also played for Litex Lovech, Cherno More, Naftex Burgas, Ethnikos Piraeus, Kallithea, Fostiras, Chernomorets Burgas, Sportist Svoge and FC Topolite. Petrov made his final appearance in his career for Lokomotiv Plovdiv, in a 0–0 draw against Litex Lovech for Bulgarian Cup on 31 October 2012, coming on as a substitute. On 13 January 2013, Petrov announced his retirement from football.

Honours

Club
Litex Lovech
 Bulgarian A PFG: 1998–99
 Bulgarian Cup: 2001

References

External links
 

1977 births
Living people
Bulgarian footballers
Bulgarian expatriates in Greece
First Professional Football League (Bulgaria) players
PFC Spartak Varna players
PFC Litex Lovech players
PFC Cherno More Varna players
Neftochimic Burgas players
Ethnikos Piraeus F.C. players
Kallithea F.C. players
PFC Chernomorets Burgas players
FC Sportist Svoge players
PFC Lokomotiv Plovdiv players
Expatriate footballers in Greece
Association football midfielders
Sportspeople from Varna, Bulgaria